Nicolai Ceban (Romanian, Nicolae Ceban; Moldovan Cyrillic: Чебан, Николай; born 30 March 1986 in Talmaza, Moldavia, Soviet Union) is a Moldovan freestyle wrestler. At the 2008 Summer Olympics in the freestyle 96 kg event, he was knocked out in the first round by Gergely Kiss.

He competed in the freestyle 96 kg event at the 2012 Summer Olympics; after defeating Sinivie Boltic in the 1/8 finals, he was eliminated by Giorgi Gogshelidze in the quarterfinals.

Ceban competed in the freestyle 97 kg event at the 2016 Summer Olympics in Rio de Janeiro. He was defeated by Albert Saritov of Romania in the first elimination round. He was the flagbearer for Moldova during the Parade of Nations.

References

External links
 

1986 births
Living people
Moldovan male sport wrestlers
Olympic wrestlers of Moldova
Wrestlers at the 2008 Summer Olympics
Wrestlers at the 2012 Summer Olympics
European Games competitors for Moldova
Wrestlers at the 2015 European Games
Wrestlers at the 2016 Summer Olympics
Wrestlers at the 2019 European Games
21st-century Moldovan people